Nikita Vladimirovich Satalkin (born 13 October 1987) is a Russian former professional football player.

Club career
He played 7 seasons in the Russian Football National League for 8 different clubs.

External links
 

1987 births
People from Orenburg
Living people
Russian footballers
Association football forwards
Association football midfielders
FC Orenburg players
FC Luch Vladivostok players
FC Zhemchuzhina Sochi players
FC Torpedo Moscow players
FC SKA-Khabarovsk players
FC Sakhalin Yuzhno-Sakhalinsk players
FC Volga Nizhny Novgorod players
FC Fakel Voronezh players
Sportspeople from Orenburg Oblast